Barbel may refer to:

Barbel (anatomy), a whisker-like organ near the mouth found in some fish (notably catfish, loaches and cyprinids) and turtles
Barbel (fish), a common name for certain species of fish
Barbus barbus, a species of cyprinid native to Eurasia
Clarias gariepinus and related species of African catfish
USS Barbel (SS-316), a US Navy submarine launched in 1943
USS Barbel (SS-580), a US Navy submarine launched in 1958
Barbel class of submarines of which SS-580 was the lead ship

People
Given name
Bärbel, a German-language feminine given name

Surname
 Jacques Barbel (c. 1670–1740), French soldier
 Marie-Anne Barbel (1704–1793), French-Canadian businesswoman

See also
Barbell, weight training equipment